Avan Yuzbashi (ca. 1670–1735) was an 18th-century Armenian military leader in Karabagh, and an important figure of the Armenian liberation struggle during the 1720s in Karabagh.

Biography
Avan and his family were originally from Lori. They eventually moved to Shushi in Varanda in 1717. Armenian historian Ashot Hovhannisian wrote that Avan Yuzbashi likely laid the foundation for Shusha's fortress walls in 1724, if not earlier. 

Avan was instrumental in aiding David Bek's forces and gaining victories over the forces of Safavid Iran and the Ottoman Empire in the Zangezur region. In a letter to the Russian monarch, Yuzbashi wrote, "We will fight until that time when we will enter the service of the tsar, and all will perish to the last one but we will not leave Christianity; we will fight for our faith." Kekhva Chelebi, an Armenian patriot who maintained correspondence between the meliks of Karabakh and the Russian authorities, reports:

Avan was given the title of "khan" by king Tahmasp II and was appointed as commander-in-chief of Karabagh by him.

Notes

References

Sources
 
 
 

Armenian revolutionaries
17th-century people of Safavid Iran
Persian Armenians
1670 births
1735 deaths
18th-century people of Safavid Iran